The Queensland Railways B15 class locomotive is an old class of 4-6-0 engines operated by the Queensland Railways.

History
In 1889 the first B15 class locomotives built by Nasmyth, Wilson & Co entered service. Further orders from Evans, Anderson, Phelan & Co, Yorkshire Engine Company and Walkers Limited saw the class total of 92 engines by 1899. Per Queensland Railway's classification system they were designated the B15 class engine, B representing they had three driving axles, and   diameter cylinders. A further six engines were acquired In 1919 when the Queensland Railways took over the Chillagoe Railway & Mining Co.

Problems with broken rails saw three sets of  driving wheels acquired from the South Australian Railways and fitted to 336 at North Ipswich Railway Workshops in November 1900. Judged a success, most others were fitted over the next 30 years. They spent most of their life operating out of Cairns.

Preservation
Two examples are preserved.
290 at the Workshops Rail Museum
299 at Maryborough station

References

Railway locomotives introduced in 1889
B15
Walkers Limited locomotives
YEC locomotives
3 ft 6 in gauge locomotives of Australia
4-6-0 locomotives